Helmut Kunisch (born 26 November 1936) is a Swiss long-distance runner. He competed in the marathon at the 1968 Summer Olympics.

References

External links
 

1936 births
Living people
Athletes (track and field) at the 1968 Summer Olympics
Swiss male long-distance runners
Swiss male marathon runners
Olympic athletes of Switzerland
Sportspeople from the canton of Bern